Armistead Burwell may refer to:

Armistead Burwell (planter) (1777–1841), lived in the early 19th century in Dinwiddie County, Virginia as a planter
Armistead Burwell (burgess) (1703–1754), member of the Virginia House of Burgesses from Williamsburg 1753–1754
Armistead Burwell (judge) (1839–1913), associate justice of the North Carolina Supreme Court from 1892 to 1894
Armistead Burwell Smith IV (born 1970), American composer and multi-instrumentalist
 Armistead Ravenscroft Burwell, a descendant of the prominent Burwell family of Virginia
 Armistead Burwell (delegate) (1770–1820), member of the Virginia House of Delegates from Mecklenburg County, Virginia 1815–1818